Jeram Padang is a state constituency in Jempol, Negeri Sembilan, Malaysia. Jeram Padang is currently represented in the Negeri Sembilan State Legislative Assembly.

The state constituency is mandated to return a single member to the Negeri Sembilan State Legislative Assembly under the first past the post voting system.

The current voter composition of Jeram Padang is 49.47% Malay, 35.74% Indian, 10.06% Chinese and 4.41% Others.

Polling districts 
Ladang Bahau, Taman Jaya, Kuala Kepis, Jeram Padang, Ladang Middleton, Ladang Kelpin, Ladang Bukit Pilah, Rompin, Palong 2, Palong 1

State Representatives

Election Results

References

Negeri Sembilan state constituencies